Zehnder's is a large restaurant in Frankenmuth, Michigan. It has seating for 1,500 people and features all-you-can-eat family-style chicken dinners, seafood, steaks, fresh baked goods and European desserts.  Every year Zehnder's serves almost a million people.  In the 1980s, it was one of the ten largest restaurants in the United States.

History 

Zehnder's was originally built as the Exchange Hotel by Henry Reichle in 1856. Reichle ran the hotel for twenty years, after which it was sold and operated by several different people. In 1927, William Zehnder Sr. purchased the hotel remodeling the building, including redesigning its facade to resemble Mount Vernon.  After World War II, the business grew rapidly.

In March 1947, the business was turned over to Zehnder's children. The business became a corporation, and in the 1950s the Zehnders bought Fischer's Hotel located across the street, renaming it the Bavarian Inn in 1959. In 1955, William Zehnder Jr. (manager of the Bavarian Inn) and Edwin Zehnder (manager of Zehnder's Restaurant) purchased the interests of Zehnder's, Inc. from their brothers and sister. They re-decorated the restaurant in a Bavarian theme after visiting Bavaria on vacation, and the annual Frankenmuth Bavarian Festival began during their week-long grand re-opening celebration.

In 1984, Zehnder's and the Bavarian Inn became separate corporations with friendly competition between relatives.

John Zehnder, the executive chef and food and beverage manager at Zehnder's, received the 2011 Hermann G. Rusch Chef's Achievement Award from the American Culinary Federation.

References

External links

 

Restaurants in Michigan
Hotels established in 1856
Restaurants established in 1856
1856 establishments in Michigan
Buildings and structures in Saginaw County, Michigan
Tourist attractions in Saginaw County, Michigan